Dimethyltrienolone (developmental code name RU-2420) is a synthetic, orally active, and extremely potent anabolic–androgenic steroid (AAS) and 17α-alkylated 19-nortestosterone (nandrolone) derivative which was never marketed for medical use. It has among the highest known affinity of any AAS for the androgen (and progesterone) receptors, and has been said to be perhaps the most potent AAS to have ever been developed.

Pharmacology

Pharmacodynamics
Dimethyltrienolone is an extremely potent agonist of the androgen and progesterone receptors and hence AAS and progestogen. In animal bioassays, it was shown to possess more than 100 times the anabolic and androgenic potency of the reference AAS methyltestosterone. The drug is not a substrate for 5α-reductase and so is not potentiated or inactivated in so-called "androgenic" tissues like the prostate gland or skin. It is also not a substrate for aromatase and so has no estrogenic activity. Due to its lack of estrogenicity, dimethyltrienolone has no propensity for causing estrogenic side effects like gynecomastia. Because of its C17α methyl group and very high resistance to hepatic metabolism, dimethyltrienolone is said to be exceedingly hepatotoxic.

Chemistry

Dimethyltrienolone, also known as 7α,17α-dimethyl-δ9,11-19-nortestosterone or as 7α,17α-dimethylestra-4,9,11-trien-17β-ol-3-one, as well as 7α,17α-dimethyltrenbolone, is a synthetic estrane steroid and a 17α-alkylated derivative of nandrolone (19-nortestosterone). It is the 7α,17α-dimethyl derivative of trenbolone and the 7α-methyl derivative of metribolone, as well as the δ9,11 analogue of metribolone and the δ9,11, 17α-methylated derivative of trestolone.

History
Dimethyltrienolone was first described in 1967. It was never marketed for medical use.

See also
 Tetrahydrogestrinone
 Trimethyltrienolone

References

1-Methylcyclopentanols
Androgens and anabolic steroids
Estranes
Hepatotoxins
Enones
Progestogens
Polyenes